Toshitsugu is a masculine Japanese given name.

Possible writings
Toshitsugu can be written using different combinations of kanji characters. Here are some examples:

敏次, "agile, next"
敏継, "agile, continue"
敏嗣, "agile, succession"
俊次, "talented, next"
俊継, "talented, continue"
俊嗣, "talented, succession"
利次, "benefit, next"
利継, "benefit, continue"
利嗣, "benefit, succession"
寿次, "long life, next"
寿継, "long life, continue"
寿嗣, "long life, succession"
年次, "year, next"
年継, "year, continue"
年嗣, "year, succession"
斗志二, "Big Dipper, intention, two"

The name can also be written in hiragana としつぐ or katakana トシツグ.

Notable people with the name
Toshitsugu Maeda (前田 利次, 1617–1674), Japanese daimyō.
Toshitsugu Saito (斉藤 斗志二, born 1944), Japanese politician.
Toshitsugu Takamatsu (高松 寿嗣, 1889–1972), Japanese ninjutsu practitioner.

Japanese masculine given names